This is a list of subfamilies and genera of the dogbane family Apocynaceae.
A list of synonyms for the various genera is given  here, together with supporting references.

Subfamilies
Apocynoideae and Rauvolfioideae are part of Apocynaceae sensu stricto, whilst the other three subfamilies belong to the former Asclepiadaceae. The family Apocynaceae is the result of a conflation of these two families.
Apocynoideae
Asclepiadoideae
Periplocoideae
Rauvolfioideae
Secamonoideae

Genera
Note: this list may be incomplete

 Acokanthera
 Adenium
 Aganonerion
 Aganosma
 Alafia
 Allamanda
 Allomarkgrafia
 Allowoodsonia
 Alstonia
 Alyxia
 Amalocalyx
 Ambelania
 Amsonia
 Ancylobothrys
 Anechites
 Angadenia
 Anodendron
 Apocynum
 Araujia
 Artia
 Asclepias
 Asketanthera
 Aspidosperma
 Baissea
 Beaumontia
 Bousigonia
 Brachystelma
 Cabucala
 Callichilia
 Calocrater
 Calotropis
 Cameraria
 Caralluma
 Carissa
 Carpodinus
 Carruthersia
 Carvalhoa
 Cascabela
 Catharanthus
 Cerbera
 Cerberiopsis
 Ceropegia
 Chamaeclitandra
 Chilocarpus
 Chonemorpha
 Cionura
 Cleghornia
 Clitandra
 Condylocarpon
 Couma
 Craspidospermum
 Crioceras
 Cryptostegia
 Cycladenia
 Cyclocotyla
 Cylindropsis
 Cynanchum
 Delphyodon
 Dewevrella
 Dictyophleba
 Diplorhynchus
 Dischidia
 Dyera
 Echites
 Elytropus
 Epigynium
 Eucorymbia
 Farquharia
 Fernaldia
 Forsteronia
 Funtumia
 Galactophora
 Geissospermum
 Gonioma
 Grisseea
 Gymnema
 Hancornia
 Haplophyton
 Heynella
 Hiepia
 Himatanthus
 Holarrhena
 Hoodia
 Hoya
 Huernia
 Hunteria
 Hymenolophus
 Ichnocarpus
 Isonema
 Ixodonerium
 Kamettia
 Kibatalia
 Kopsia
 Lacmellea
 Landolphia
 Laubertia
 Laxoplumeria
 Lepinia
 Lepiniopsis
 Leuconotis
 Lochnera
 Lyonsia
 Maclaudia
 Macoubea
 Macropharynx
 Malouetia
 Mandevilla
 Mascarenhasia
 Matelea
 Melodinus
 Mesechites
 Micrechites
 Microplumeria
 Molongum
 Mondia
 Mortoniella
 Motandra
 Mucoa
 Neobracea
 Neocouma
 Nerium
 Nouettea
 Ochrosia
 Odontadenia
 Oncinotis
 Orbea
 Orthopichonia
 Pachypodium
 Pacouria
 Papuechites
 Parahancornia
 Parameria
 Parepigynum
 Parsonsia
 Peltastes
 Pentalinon
 Periploca
 Petchia
 Picralima
 Plectaneia
 Pleiocarpa
 Pleioceras
 Plumeria
 Pottsia
 Prestonia
 Pycnobotrya
 Quiotania
 Rauvolfia
 Rhabdadenia
 Rhazya
 Rhigospira
 Rhodocalyx
 Ruehssia
 Saba
 Sacleuxia
 Schizozygia
 Secamonopsis
 Secondatia
 Sindechites
 Skytanthus
 Spirolobium
 Spongiosperma
 Stapelia
 Stemmadenia
 Stephanostegia
 Stephanostema
 Stephanotis
 Stipecoma
 Strempeliopsis
 Strophanthus
 Tabernaemontana
 Tabernanthe
 Temnadenia
 Thenardia
 Thevetia
 Thoreauea
 Tintinnabularia
 Trachelospermum
 Treutlera
 Urceola
 Urnularia
 Vahadenia
 Vailia
 Vallariopsis
 Vallaris
 Vallesia
 Vinca
 Vincetoxicum
 Voacanga
 Willughbeia
 Woytkowskia
 Wrightia
 Xylinabaria
 Xylinabariopsis

Lists of plant genera (alphabetic)